Alexandru Tudorie (born 19 March 1996) is a Romanian professional footballer who plays as a striker for Liga I club Sepsi OSK.

Club career

Oțelul Galați
After 2 years of playing for the youth team of Oțelul Galați, Tudorie signed his first professional contract in 2012, aged 16. After 1 year of playing for the reserve team, scoring 6 goals in 10 matches, Tudorie was called up to the first team in 2013. He has played 46 matches and scored 6 goals for the club.
In 2014, he was taken on trial at Borussia Mönchengladbach. Previously, Tudorie has attracted interest from Milan but the clubs couldn't reach an agreement, and also from Sampdoria and Málaga.

FCSB and Loan to Voluntari
On 21 June 2015, Tudorie signed a 5-year contract with Romanian champions FCSB for oror or an undisclosed fee.
Alexandru Tudorie was loaned to Voluntari for the 2015-16 Liga I league season.
Alexandru Tudorie came back to FCSB for the 2016-17 Liga I season. Tudorie was the goalscorer in the pre-season friendly matches, scoring three goals. In the first game of the season he won with the team the 2015-16 Cupa Ligii. He played his first UEFA Champions League qualifier match against Sparta Prague.

Voluntari
On 6 July 2017, he returned to FC Voluntari, this time on permanent basis. At this club he scored his first career hat-trick against Sepsi Sfântu Gheorghe on 10 September 2017.

Arsenal Tula
On 4 July 2019, he signed a long-term contract with Russian Premier League club FC Arsenal Tula.

Second loan to Voluntari
On 6 February 2020, he returned to Voluntari once again, on a 6-month loan.

Loan to Universitatea 
On 12 August 2020, he was loaned to Universitatea Craiova for the 2020–21 season, with an option to purchase.

Sepsi OSK
On 3 January 2022, he signed a 1.5-year contract with Sepsi OSK.

Career statistics

Club

Honours
FCSB
Supercupa României: 2015
Cupa Ligii: 2015–16

Universitatea Craiova
Cupa României: 2020–21

Sepsi OSK 
Cupa României: 2021–22
Supercupa României: 2022

References

External links

1996 births
Sportspeople from Galați
Living people
Romanian footballers
Romania youth international footballers
Romania under-21 international footballers
Association football forwards
Liga I players
Liga III players
ASC Oțelul Galați players
FC Steaua București players
FC Voluntari players
Russian Premier League players
FC Arsenal Tula players
CS Universitatea Craiova players
Sepsi OSK Sfântu Gheorghe players
Romanian expatriate footballers
Romanian expatriate sportspeople in Russia
Expatriate footballers in Russia